Furioso is a 1950 West German drama film directed by Johannes Meyer and starring Ewald Balser, Kirsten Heiberg and Peter van Eyck.  It was shot at the Wandsbek Studios in Hamburg and on location in Grömitz. The film's sets were designed by the art directors Hans Ledersteger and Ernst Richter.

Synopsis
Professor Soldin, a celebrated music teacher has an extremely favourite pupil Peter von Rhoden. His world is broken when Peter has an affair with Soldin's wife Isa. Although they go off together Soldin continues to support the growing career of his young protégé.

Cast
 Ewald Balser as 	Professor Soldin
 Kirsten Heiberg as Isa Soldin, seine Frau
 Peter van Eyck as 	Peter von Rhoden
 Petra Peters as 	Hilma Delius
 Carl-Heinz Schroth as Carlo
 Käthe Haack as 	Frau Delius
 Ursula Herking as Erna
 Josef Sieber as 	Gerhard
 Karin Jacobsen as 	Karin Steengracht
 Ingrid Lutz as Gerti

References

Bibliography
Bock, Hans-Michael and Bergfelder, Tim. The Concise Cinegraph: An Encyclopedia of German Cinema. Berghahn Books, 2009.

External links 
 

1950 films
1950 drama films
German drama films
West German films
1950s German-language films
Films directed by Johannes Meyer
Films shot at Wandsbek Studios
1950s German films
Films shot in Hamburg
Films set in Hamburg

de:Furioso (1950)